The Venetian Macao is a hotel and casino resort in Macau owned by the American Las Vegas Sands company. The 39-story structure on Macau's Cotai Strip has  of floor space, and is modeled on its sister casino resort The Venetian Las Vegas. It is the second-largest casino in the world, the largest single structure hotel in Asia, and the tenth-largest building in the world by floor area.

The main hotel tower was finished in July 2007, and the resort officially opened on 28 August 2007.

Its lead architects were Aedas and HKS, Inc., who were responsible for its design, coordination and implementation.

Casino

The casino measures . It is further divided into four themed gaming areas:  

 Golden Fish
 Imperial House
 Red Dragon
 Phoenix

The casino contains slot machines and gambling tables.

The attached hotel offers a club called Paiza Club which caters to premium guests. The gaming area of the Paiza Club is divided into individual private gaming rooms each named for notable Asian cities and regions such as Yunnan, Guangzhou, Hong Kong, Singapore and Kuala Lumpur. 

The guests of the club have exclusive access to the club dining outlet, the Paiza Club Dining & Lounge, which is open 24 hours a day.

Entertainment

Cotai Arena 

The Cotai Arena (formerly known as the Venetian Arena) is an indoor arena, opened in 2007 with a seating capacity of 2,000 - 13,500. It is ideal for hosting large indoor functions such as sporting events like basketball, tennis, and boxing, as well as concerts and international televised awards shows. Events are held year round. 

The Cotai Arena has 4 levels: 

 Event Level
 Main Concourse
 Upper Concourse 
 VIP Level

Zaia

Zaia, a 90-minute stage production by the Canadian entertainment company Cirque du Soleil, ran between 27 August 2008 and 19 February 2012 in a custom-built theater at the Venetian Macao. The show, directed by Neilson Vignola and Gilles Maheu, featured a cast of 75 circus artists. The show's theme was a young girl's perception of the stars and planets, space and infinity, populated by otherworldly creatures. The theater housing the performance seated 1,800 spectators at a time.

Transportation

Macau Light Rapid Transit 

The Venetian Macao is within walking distance from Cotai West Station on the Taipa section of the Macau Light Rapid Transit that serves the Cotai Strip and the larger area of Cotai.

Controversies

On 12 November 2008, the gates were locked to the construction labour force from a variety of Asian countries as projects were suspended. Hsin Chong, the project manager for the Venetian, laid off approximately 400 staff. As many workers had been there for less than two years, no severance was due. The next day, Sands' president for Asia announced that up to 11,000 workers would be losing their jobs as the company was halting building projects in Macao.

In 2010 the Chinese press reported that authorities had found more than 100 prostitutes inside the casino as part of a "sex-trade crackdown".

In early 2011 the United States Department of Justice and the U.S. Securities and Exchange Commission initiated an investigation into the Las Vegas Sands Corporation with respect to the compliance of its Macao properties with the Foreign Corrupt Practices Act.

See also

 Gambling in Macau
 Cotai Jet – owned by The Venetian Macao, operating high-speed catamaran ferry services between Taipa Temporary Ferry Terminal and Hong Kong–Macau Ferry Terminal, Hong Kong
 List of properties on the Cotai Strip
 List of Macau casinos

References

External links

 

Casinos in Macau
Resorts in Macau
Skyscrapers in Macau
Casinos completed in 2007
Hotel buildings completed in 2007
Hotels in Macau
Articles containing video clips
Casino hotels
Cotai
Skyscraper hotels in Macau